The Yorkshire Men's League is a rugby league competition for clubs in Yorkshire. It is a successor league for the Rugby League Conference also comprising clubs from the CMS Yorkshire league, Pennine League and Hull & District League.

History

The Yorkshire Men's League comes from the merger of elements from two strands of rugby league: the British Amateur Rugby League Association and Rugby League Conference.

The British Amateur Rugby League Association (BARLA) was created in 1973 by a group of enthusiasts concerned about the dramatic disappearance of many amateur leagues and clubs. BARLA merged the vast majority of the district leagues into larger regional leagues and created an elite National Conference League, this saw a revitalisation of the game in heartland areas of Yorkshire.

In contrast, the Rugby League Conference (RLC) was born in 1997 as the Southern Conference, a 10-team pilot league for teams in the South of England and English Midlands taking place in the summer time rather than the traditional winter season. It led to the creation of many new teams in non-traditional areas; Rotherham Giants became the first Yorkshire-based team to join in 2000. Other Yorkshire teams, mostly non-traditional parts of Yorkshire such as North Yorkshire and South Yorkshire followed playing in the North East and North Midlands divisions until a Yorkshire division was created in 2004.

By 2008, there were enough sides for a higher level Yorkshire Premier division to be created and in 2010, a Yorkshire & Humber Merit League was created out of existing merit leagues. The Conference in Yorkshire thus had a three tier structure with the Yorkshire Premier division at the top and the Yorkshire regional division and the Yorkshire & Humber merit league below. 

With the RLC growing rapidly, some BARLA sides chose to leave traditional winter leagues and join the summer-based RLC. However, in 2011, the National Conference League, voted to switch to a summer season and most of the reserve teams followed. There was a short season from September to November in 2011 with teams from British Amateur Rugby League Association leagues CMS Yorkshire league, Pennine League and Hull & District League playing in four regional groups under the name Yorkshire Men's League. 

The Rugby League Conference was replaced in 2012 by a series of locally administered leagues. This saw the Yorkshire Men's League merge with the RLC Yorkshire Premier and regional divisions as well as the Yorkshire & Humber merit league to create a three-tier structure.

Yorkshire Men's League Pyramid

The Yorkshire Mens League currently runs four divisions with promotion and relegation between them. Division 4 is split into three.
 Premier Division
 Division 1
 Division 2
 Division 3
 Division 4A, Division 4B, Division 4C

The YML also runs two separate leagues separate from the main competition for Yorkshire based National Conference League clubs to run reserve side in:

 NCL East
 NCL West

2018 Clubs

Premier Division

Division 1

Division 2

Division 3

Division 4

Results

Champions

See also
 British rugby league system

External links
Official website 

Rugby league competitions in Yorkshire
Sports leagues established in 2011
2011 establishments in England